STAYC (acronym for Star to a Young Culture) is a South Korean girl group formed by High Up Entertainment. The group is composed of six members: Sumin, Sieun, Isa, Seeun, Yoon, and J. They debuted on November 12, 2020, with the release of their debut single album Star to a Young Culture.

Name
The group's name, STAYC, is an acronym for "Star to a Young Culture", and is meant to "reflect the act's aim of dominating pop culture".

History

2016–2019: Pre-debut
Sieun was well-known prior to debut as both the daughter of veteran singer Park Nam-jung, and for her roles in dramas such as The Good Wife, Queen for Seven Days, and The Crowned Clown. She won the Youth Acting Award in 2018 SBS Drama Awards for her role in Still 17.

Seeun was known as an actress, appearing in shows like The Guardians and Circle.

Prior to debut, STAYC was known as "High Up Girls", named after their company, High Up Entertainment. The members, along with unsuccessful trainees Chang Chien-chien ("Lydia") and Kim Min-jung, were featured in the YouTube Originals docuseries K-Pop Evolution during the last few months of their training before debut.

2020: Debut with Star to a Young Culture

On September 8, it was announced that Black Eyed Pilseung of High Up Entertainment would debut their first girl group, with Sieun named as its first member. On October 8, High Up Entertainment announced that the group would be debuting in November. Three last members - Isa, J, and Yoon were revealed via prologue films on October 12, 13 and 14 respectively. On October 22, the title of their single album was announced to be Star to a Young Culture, with the lead single "So Bad". The teaser schedule was released the same day. The single album was announced to be produced by Black Eyed Pilseung, known for previous hits such as "TT", "Touch My Body", "Roller Coaster", and "Dumhdurum". The producing duo described the group's sound as "Teen Fresh", a combination of "Teen" and "Fresh", highlighting the group's "unique individual vocal colors". Prior to the album's release, promotions were done through 1theK's YouTube page. These included dance covers of groups such as Blackpink, BTS, and Stray Kids, which received over 1 million views, and a vocal cover of songs by Twice and Red Velvet which received over 2 million views.

On November 12, the music video for the album's lead single "So Bad" was released, receiving over 2.6 million views in the first 24 hours. Their album was released on the same day, selling over 4,300 copies on its first day, the most for a debut girl group in 2020. It went on to sell more than 10,000 copies on its first week, becoming the first debut album by a girl group in 2020 to do so. They promoted the album through a V Live debut showcase, promoting both the lead single, "So Bad" and B-side "Like This". The group made their music show debut on November 13, 2020, at KBS Music Bank, which was followed up with performances at Show Champion, Inkigayo, and The Show. The album debuted at number 17 on the weekly Gaon Album Chart. "So Bad" debuted at number 90 on Billboard's K-pop Hot 100, and number 21 on the World Digital Song Sales chart.

2021–present: Staydom, Stereotype, Young-Luv.com, and Teddy Bear 

On April 8, 2021, STAYC released their second single album Staydom and its lead single "ASAP". The music video of "ASAP" was released simultaneously with the album and reached 20 million views in nine days. The single also entered the Billboard K-pop 100 weekly chart. Staydom sold 56,198 copies in its first month.

On September 6, the group released their first extended play Stereotype and its lead single of the same name. The music video reached 30 million views in 21 days. The album recorded sales of over 114,000 copies in its first week. On September 14, the group received their first music show trophy on SBS MTV's The Show with an overall score of 8,760 points.

On February 21, 2022, STAYC released their second extended play Young-Luv.com and its lead single "Run2U". The album debuted atop the Gaon Album Chart, becoming their first number one album on the chart. The single peaked at number 4 on the Gaon Digital Chart.

On July 19, STAYC released their third single album We Need Love and its lead single "Beautiful Monster". It has been announced that the group will hold their first fan meeting on August 13. 

On November 23, STAYC made their Japanese debut with the single "Poppy". The single peaked at number 7 on the Oricon Singles Chart.

On January 18, 2023, High Up Entertainment announced that STAYC would be releasing an album in February. On January 31, it was announced STAYC would be releasing their fourth single album titled Teddy Bear on February 14.

Members
 Sumin – leader
 Sieun
 Isa
 Seeun
 Yoon
 J

Discography

Extended plays

Single albums

Singles

Other charted songs

Videography

Music videos

Awards and nominations

Listicles

Notes

References

External links

 
2020 establishments in South Korea
K-pop music groups
Musical groups established in 2020
Musical groups from Seoul
South Korean girl groups
South Korean dance music groups